The Shurtan is a river in Perm Krai and Sverdlovsk Oblast, Russia, a left tributary of the Irgina, which in turn is a tributary of the Sylva.

References 

Rivers of Perm Krai
Rivers of Sverdlovsk Oblast